Adams Island (Inuit: Tuujjuk) is an uninhabited island in the Qikiqtaaluk Region of Nunavut, Canada. The island is located in Baffin Bay off the northeastern coast of Baffin Island in the Arctic Archipelago. Nearby are Dexterity Island (northeast), Dexterity Fiord and Baffin Island (east), Tromso Fiord (south), Paterson Inlet (west), Bergesen Island (northwest), and Isbjorn Strait (north).

Adams Island is irregularly shaped, its eastern and western sides split by the Ratcliffe Arm.

Another, much smaller, Adams Island is located off the northeastern tip of Baffin Island.

References

External links 
 Adams Island in the Atlas of Canada - Toporama; Natural Resources Canada
 Adams Island (smaller) in the Atlas of Canada - Toporama; Natural Resources Canada

Islands of Baffin Bay
Islands of Baffin Island
Uninhabited islands of Qikiqtaaluk Region